Ceiller is a surname, and may refer to:

Alfred Cellier (1844–1891), English composer, orchestrator and conductor
Elizabeth Cellier (the "Popish Midwife"), English Catholic midwifewho stood trial for treason for her alleged part in the "Meal-Tub Plot"
François Cellier (1849–1914), English conductor and composer
Frank Cellier (actor) (1884–1948), English actor
Jérôme Cellier (born 1984), French footballer
Marcel Cellier (1925–2013), Swiss organist, ethnomusicologist and music producer
Peter Cellier (born 1928), English actor

See also
Ceillier